Azania Bank Limited, whose formal name is First Adili Bancorp Limited, and is commonly referred to as Azania Bank, is a commercial bank in Tanzania. It is licensed by the Bank of Tanzania (BOT), the central bank and national banking regulator.

Overview
Azania Bank is a Tier One-sized commercial bank that engages in retail banking, corporate banking, lease financing, foreign exchange transactions and import/export financing, as well the issuance of letters of credit. Following the acquisition of the assets and liabilities of Bank M, in January 2019, the total assets of Azania Bank were valued at approximately TSh 1,339 billion (US$582 million). At that time the bank's shareholders equity was valued at TSh 164 billion (US$71.46 million).

History
The bank was established in 1995, as First Adili Bancorp, by Tanzanian citizens, together with national pension funds and International financial institutions, including the East African Development Bank, the Swedish International Development Agency and an American merchant bank, Gerald Metals Inc.. Today, the main shareholders are Tanzanian pension funds and Tanzanian nationals.

In January 2019, Azania Bank acquired the assets and liabilities of Bank M, a retail commercial bank, which had been under management by Bank of Tanzania since August 2018, on account of "critical liquidity problems" and inability "to meet its obligations".

Ownership
, Azania Bank's stock was owned by the following corporate entities and individuals:

Branch network
Azania Bank has its headquarters in Dar-es-Salaam. As of December 2021, the bank maintained a network of branches at the following locations:

 Masdo Branch - Samora Avenue, Dar es Salaam   
 Kariakoo Branch - Msimbazi Street, Dar es Salaam
 Kisutu Branch - Kisutu, Dar es Salaam
 Tegeta Branch - Chief House, Tegeta, Dar es Salaam 
 Mwenge Branch - Mwenge Market, Dar es Salaam 
 Mawasiliano Agency - Sam Nujoma road, Dar es Salaam
 Industrial Branch - Nyerere road, Dar es Salaam
 Lumumba Branch - Lumumba Street, Dar es Salaam
 Mwaloni Branch - Mwaloni Fish Market, Mwanza
 Rockcity Branch - Makongoro Street, Mwanza
 Rwagasore Agency - Rwagasore Street, Mwanza
 Lamadi Agency - Lamadi, Simiyu
 Kahama Branch - Kahama Central Business District, Shinyanga District
 Kagongwa Agency - Iponya Street, Kahama, Shinyanga
 Arusha City Branch - WaKaloleni Street, Arusha
 Mbauda Branch -  Mbauda Corner, Arusha-Dodoma Road, Arusha
 Arusha Business Centre - Joel Maeda Street, Arusha
 Moshi Branch - Opp. Moshi Municipal Offices, Moshi
 Geita Branch - Geita
 Geita Mineral Centre - Kalangalala Street, Geita
 Katoro Branch - Geita
 Nyarugusu Service Centre - Geita
 Morogoro Branch - Old Dar es Salaam rd Street, Morogoro
 Sokoine Branch - Kikuyu Avenue, Dodoma
 Tunduma Branch - Sumbawanga Road, Tunduma
 Mbeya City Branch - Karume Avenue Road, Mbeya

Governance
Azania Bank is governed by an eleven-person Board of Directors of whom one is an Executive Director and ten are non-Executive. The Chairman of the Board is Eng. Julius Ndyamukama, one of the non-Executive Directors. The Managing Director of Azania Bank is Ms. Esther Mangénya.

See also
 Economy of Tanzania
 List of banks in Tanzania

References

External links
Azania Bank Is A Key Mortgage Lender in Tanzania
 Azania Bank Eyes SME Growth
Bank Issues TSh65.2 Million To Upgrade Unplanned Settlements

Banks of Tanzania
Companies of Tanzania
Banks established in 1995
Economy of Tanzania
1995 establishments in Tanzania